Cull is a surname.

Notable people with the surname include:

 Dave Cull (1950–2021), New Zeland politician
 Edwin E. Cull (1891–1956), American architect
 Elizabeth Cull (born 1952), Canadian politician, teacher, and broadcast panel member
 Frederika Alexis Cull (born 1999), Indonesian beauty pageant titleholder
 Harry K. Cull (1911–2000), American politician
 John Cull (1951–2022), Australian politician
 Nicholas J. Cull (born 1964), British writer